Lubor Knapp (born 3 August 1976) is a Czech football player who last played for Union Baumgartenberg.

Career
Knapp played for several top flight Czech and Slovak football clubs, including Baník Ostrava, Viktoria Plzeň and AS Trenčín. He also played briefly in Poland for Odra Wodzisław Śląski.

Notes

External links
 Profile at SFC Opava official website

1976 births
Living people
Czech footballers
Czech First League players
FC Baník Ostrava players
FC Viktoria Plzeň players
MFK Vítkovice players
SFC Opava players
Slovak Super Liga players
AS Trenčín players
FC Senec players
FC Spartak Trnava players
Czech expatriate sportspeople in Austria
Czech expatriate sportspeople in Poland
Czech expatriate sportspeople in Slovakia
Expatriate footballers in Austria
Expatriate footballers in Poland
Expatriate footballers in Slovakia
People from Frýdek-Místek
Association football midfielders
Sportspeople from the Moravian-Silesian Region
Czech expatriate footballers